Cornuclepsis is a genus of moths belonging to the family Tortricidae.

Species
Cornuclepsis seminivea Razowski & Becker, 2000

See also
List of Tortricidae genera

References

 , 2000: Description of nine Neotropical genera of Archipini (Lepidoptera, Tortricidae) and their species. Acta Zoologica Cracoviensia 43 (3-4): 199–216.

External links
tortricidae.com

Archipini
Tortricidae genera
Taxa named by Józef Razowski